Dennstaedtia punctilobula, the eastern hayscented fern or hay-scented fern, is a species of fern native to eastern North America, from Newfoundland west to Wisconsin and Arkansas, and south in the Appalachian Mountains to northern Alabama; it is most abundant in the east of its range, with only scattered populations in the west.

It is a deciduous fern with fronds growing to 40–100 cm (rarely 130 cm) tall and 10–30 cm broad; the fronds are bipinnate, with pinnatifid pinnules about three times as long as broad. It occurs in damp or dry acidic soils in woods or open woods, from sea level up to 1,200 m altitude.

Dennstaedtia punctilobula can exhibit varying degrees of phototropism. The common name "Hay-scented Fern" comes from the fact that crushing it produces an aroma of fresh hay.

The presence of Dennstaedtia punctilobula influences the dynamics of the understory vegetation of many forests in the eastern United States. An abundance of Rubus allegheniensis in open areas encourages new tree seedlings. Where the effects of herbivorous animals (such as deer) reduce the abundance of Rubus allegheniensis, Dennstaedtia punctilobula, which is not browsed by deer, takes over. Where Dennstaedtia punctilobula becomes common, the growth of tree seedlings is restricted.

References

punctilobula
Ferns of the Americas
Ferns of Canada
Ferns of the United States
Flora of Eastern Canada
Flora of the Northeastern United States
Flora of the Southeastern United States
Flora of the Appalachian Mountains
Flora of the Great Lakes region (North America)
Plants described in 1803
Least concern flora of the United States
Least concern biota of North America
Garden plants of North America